The 1918 Kentucky Derby was the 44th running of the Kentucky Derby. The race took place May 11, 1918. Exterminator went off at odds of 30–1 to the heavily favored War Cloud. Exterminator raced at the back until the field turned for home, when he launched his bid. Nearing the wire, he passed Escoba and won the Derby by a length.

Full results

Winning Breeder: F. D. "Dixie" Knight; (KY)

Payout

 The winner received a purse of $15,000.
 Second place received $2,500.
 Third place received $1,000.
 Fourth place received $275.

References

1918
Kentucky Derby
Derby
1918 in American sports
May 1918 sports events